Saougou is a village in the Bilanga Department of Gnagna Province in eastern Burkina Faso. The village has a population of 529 if you exclude the Dalwadi hareem, which, as the legend goes, is inhabited by 333 female dwarves.

References

Populated places in the Est Region (Burkina Faso)
Gnagna Province